Michel Calonne (28 March 1927, Grenoble - 4 March 2019) was a French writer.

Works
1958: Le Plus Jeune fils de l'écureuil (short stories), éditions Robert Laffont
1960: Une folie au bord de la mer (novel), ed. Robert Laffont
1981: Hurleville (novel), Éditions Jean-Claude Lattès
1990: Les Enfances (novel), (Grand prix Jean-Giono 1991).
1991: Un silex à la mer (poetry), Éditions Gallimard, (prix Heredia 1992).
1993: L'Arbre jongleur (poetry), Maison de Poésie Fondation Émile Blémont/Presses universitaires de Nancy, (prix Verlaine). 
1997: Les Angelicos (theatre), L'Harmattan
2003: Le Bonbonnier, Pré carré
2009: Chroniques de la destruction de Paris : poème en dix-huit scènes

References

External links 
Le banquet des ombres - tome 1 (short stories)'': Edilivre, 2014.
 Michel CALONNE on the site of Éditions Viviane Hamy
 Michel Calonne on the site of the Académie française
  Écrivain ou rédacteur ? (article) on Persée

1927 births
2019 deaths
20th-century French non-fiction writers
20th-century French male writers
Grand prix Jean Giono recipients
Writers from Grenoble